Sergei Kruglov may refer to:

 Sergey Kruglov (bobsleigh) (born 1960), Russian Olympic bobsledder
 Sergei Kruglov (politician) (1907–1977), Soviet politician
 Sergei Kruglov (poet) (born 1966), Russian poet
 Sergei Kruglov (sport shooter) (born 1985), Russian Olympic sport shooter